The Perth and District Tramways Company was a tramway in Perth, Scotland, from 1895 to 1903.

History
The tramway built a line from Perth to Scone, having bought out the Scone and Perth Omnibus Company. Services started on 17 September 1895.

Closure
The company sold out to Perth Corporation for £21,800, and from 7 October 1903, services continued as Perth Corporation Tramways.

References 

1895 establishments in Scotland
Tram transport in Scotland
3 ft 6 in gauge railways in Scotland
History of Perth, Scotland
Companies based in Perth, Scotland
Transport in Perth, Scotland